Helvella elastica, commonly known as the flexible Helvella, or the elastic saddle, is a species of fungi in the family Helvellaceae of the order Pezizales. It is found in Asia, Europe, and North America. It has a roughly saddle-shaped yellow-brown cap atop a whitish stipe, and grows on soil in woods. Another colloquial name is the brown elfin saddle.

Description 

The underside is white. The flesh of H. elastica is brittle and thin. The odor and taste of this mushroom are not distinctive.

Microscopic characteristics

The spores are oblong to elliptical in shape, translucent (hyaline), contain one central oil drop (guttulate), and have dimensions of 18–22 by 10–14 µm; young spores have coarse surface warts, while older ones are smooth. The spore-bearing cells, the asci, are 260 by 17–19 µm. The paraphyses (sterile cells interspersed between the asci) are club-shaped, filled with oil drops, sometimes branched, and are 6–10 µm at the apex.

Edibility

Consumption of this fungus is not recommended as similar species in the family Helvellaceae contain the toxin gyromitrin.

Habitat and distribution 

This fungus is typically found fruiting singly, scattered, or clustered together on the ground or on wood in coniferous and deciduous woods. It has been found in Europe, North America (in "western states and provinces"), Japan, and China. It is present in summer and fall.

Similar species 

The closely related fungus Helvella albipes has a thicker stipe and a two- to four-lobed cap. Another similar species, H. latispora, has cap edges that are curled upward, rather than inward as in H. elastica.

Fibrinolytic activity 

A 2005 Korean study investigated the ability of extracts from 67 different mushroom species to perform fibrinolysis, the process of breaking down blood clots caused by the protein fibrin. H. elastica was one of seven species that had this ability; the activity of the extract was 60% of that of plasmin, the positive control used in the experiment.

References 

elastica
Fungi described in 1785
Fungi of Asia
Fungi of Europe
Fungi of North America